Opizzo Fieschi, also known as Opizo or Opiso dei' Fieschi, was a 13th-century Italian cleric from the powerful Genovese Fieschi family.

Life
Opizzo was born to the Fieschi, the Genovese dynasty of the counts of Lavagna, sometime in the first part of the 13th century. His parentage is uncertain, although certain church records suggest his father was Tedisio Fieschi.

His paternal uncle Sinibaldo was elected  in 1243. In October 1245, Opizzo was dispatched to end the conflict between Eastern Pomerania and the Teutonic Order.

The Latin patriarch of Antioch, Alberto Brescia Rezzato, died during the Council of Lyon and sometime before 22 July 1246 Pope Innocent named his nephew to succeed him. In October 1247, Opizzo was named apostolic delegate to the Seventh Crusade but he did not leave Genoa for the east until mid-1248. By then, he had secured papal approval of his authority over all bishops suffragan to the Greek patriarch of his city; upon arriving in Antioch, he excommunicated Euthymius, who was forced to flee. In late 1248, amid the Seventh Crusade, Opizzo requested help from the French king  following raids by the Turcomans; Louis granted the bishop and his lord Bohemond 600 crossbowmen but no knights, out of "fear that the army might break up and that it would prove impossible to reassemble it at the scheduled time." A papal letter of 7 November 1252 directed him to recognize that Prince Bohemond had reached the age of majority and no longer required the regency of his mother, Luciana Segni. Letters of 30 March 1254 granted him the church of Nicosia and—on account of the expenses occasioned by his visits to the Roman Curia where he was a professor of law—a portion of the income of the late bishop of Norwich and half the subsidies being directed to the aid of Antioch. He was at Acre in October 1254.

Innocent IV's successor  recognized Opizzo's continued service as papal legate in the region on 23 March 1255. When he was elected as patriarch of Jerusalem by its three canons, however, Alexander saw fit to quash the result, instead appointing the bishop of Verdun on 9 April. By 17 December, owing to the continued destruction within his territory, Opizzo was able to receive a promise to receive the first vacant position within the principalities of Antioch or Cyprus: this was made good by his receipt of the church of Limassol on Cyprus on 21 February of the next year. On 28 January 1256, the bishops of Tortosa and Tripoli were ordered to provide Opizzo with the funds previously deposited with the Templars and Hospitallers by  On 6 September, however, he was stripped of his jurisdiction over Nicosia.

Under Alexander IV's successor , Opizzo received the income of the priory of St Lazarus of Tripoli on 13 January 1262. By 1264, Opizzo was being represented in Antioch by a vicar and he was apparently not present in the city when it fell with great bloodshed to Baibars, the sultan of Egypt, on 15 April 1268.

Pope Nicholas III named him director of the church of Trani on 1 April 1288.

Pope Nicholas IV named him administrator of the diocese of Genoa on 4 June 1288, causing him to surrender Trani by 5 November. Supposedly, he supported the failed uprising on 1 January 1289; afterwards, he remained in his office but fled the city, daily administration being left to his vicar Bartolomeo da Reggio. He died in or shortly after 1291.

See also
 Principality of Antioch
 Princes Bohemond V (1233–1252) and VI (1252–1268)
 Dorotheus (1219–1245) and Simeon II (1245–1268), Orthodox patriarchs of Antioch
 Ignatius III David (1222–1252) and John XII bar Maʿdani (1252–1263), Syriac patriarchs of Antioch

References

Citations

Bibliography

 . 

 . 

 .
 .
 .

13th-century Italian Roman Catholic bishops
Latin Patriarchs of Antioch
Fieschi family
13th-century Genoese people